Pertubuhan Profesional Melayu & Pewaris Bangsa (better known by its abbreviation: ProWaris) is a non-governmental organization (NGO) that started in 2001 as a movement of Malay professionals aiming to fight for the Malay's agendas.

History and leadership
The idle and delayed movement of ProWaris can be attributed to Malaysia's struggling economy and conflicting interests between the government and its people. Its leadership attempted to raise a third voice—in order to influence the United Malays National Organisation (UMNO) party—a voice similar to the leadership of Datuk Shahrir Abdul Samad; who was more inline with the ex-prime minister Tun Dr. Mahathir Mohamed. ProWaris demanded that Prime Minister Datuk Seri Abdullah Ahmad Badawi resign based on his weak leadership.

Its president, Feriz Omar, was said to have accused the Malays of lacking the courage to confront the country's leadership issues. Feriz Omar denied making such statements. 

ProWaris became inactive and dormant notably after Shahrir lost his bid for a place in the Supreme Council in the party leadership election in 2009 UMNO General Assembly and consequently resigned from the Cabinet.

References

External links 
 Official website
 Facebook PROWARIS MALAYSIA 
 Facebook Sahabat Prowaris

2001 establishments in Malaysia
Political organisations based in Malaysia
Non-profit organisations based in Malaysia
Political advocacy groups in Malaysia